The Nové spojení (Czech for "New Connection", full name Nové spojení Praha hl.n., Masarykovo n. – Libeň, Vysočany, Holešovice) is a series of tunnels and bridges forming an important part of the railway network in Prague, Czech Republic. The network was constructed between 2004 and 2008 and opened in 2010. It links the two central stations, Praha hlavní and Praha Masarykovo, to Libeň, Vysočany and Holešovice stations and the start of their respective mainline corridors towards Česká Třebová, Hradec Králové and Ústí nad Labem. The construction has increased the capacity of the trunk lines serving Praha hlavní nádraží, allowing more trains to terminate there. Prior to its completion, many international trains terminated at Holešovice station, due to lack of access to the centre from the northern and eastern routes. The construction is also part of a larger plan to improve the sections of pan-European corridors on Czech territory.

After leaving both central stations, the electrified tracks lead through a 1.3 km-long tunnel under Vítkov hill in Žižkov, then over a series of bridges skirting the Žižkov-Libeň border leading to a large junction at Balabenka. From here, trains continue east to Vysočany and Libeň, and turn north to Holešovice station, making use of the previously existing tracks which lead to Holešovice from Libeň. The construction of Nové spojení also led to numerous improvements in road infrastructure, including a heated overbridge at Krejcárek, which replaced a level crossing.

Construction
The construction was led by Skanska and also Metrostav and Subterra. A total of 267 separate structures were built for the project. The overhead wires built on the line were specifically designed to be as unobtrusive as possible to views of the city centre.

Preliminary construction works before the project began were completed in 2002, costing approximately 260 million Czech koruna (about US$7.3 million) and included the construction of a large bridge over Seifertova street in Žižkov at the northern end of hlavní nádraží.

Following this bridge, the new track leads under an electrified double-tracked tunnel under Vítkov hill, which replaced a non-electrified one-track tunnel. The last service to travel on the old tunnel prior to its demolition was a steam service from Prague (hlavní) to České Velenice at the Czech-Austrian border on 11 December 2005. In 2010, a cycle path was opened on the route of the old tunnel.

The construction of this section cost 262.3 million CZK. The entire project won the transport category of the Czech stavba roku (construction of the year) award in 2009.

Future
A Nové spojení 2 is proposed, as a series of underground tunnels; one from the Karlín area to Praha-Smíchov railway station via the city centre, the other from Karlín looping back to nám. Bratří Synků before surfacing past Praha-Vršovice railway station. Unlike the first Nové spojení project, this will contain underground stations at Florenc, Opera, Karlovo náměstí, and Náměstí Bratří Synků.

Gallery

References

External links

 Official website (in Czech)

Buildings and structures in Prague
Rail infrastructure in the Czech Republic
Rail transport in Prague
2010 establishments in the Czech Republic
21st-century architecture in the Czech Republic